Kerridge is a village in Cheshire, England, part of the parish of Bollington. Kerridge borders the neighbouring parish of Rainow.

It gives its name to Kerridge Ridge – one of the western foothills of the Pennines – by which it stands. It is overlooked by the local landmark of White Nancy.  The local industries were quarrying and cotton mills, of which remnants remain.

On 29 February 1912, the Macclesfield Canal at Kerridge burst its banks, flooding several nearby streets.

Kerridge itself comes from 'key ridge', and was known in Old English as 'Gaeg Hrycg'.

References

External links

Local webpage
Heritage project

Bollington
Villages in Cheshire
Towns and villages of the Peak District